

England

Head coach: Mike Davis

 Bill Beaumont (c.)
 Phil Blakeway
 John Carleton
 Maurice Colclough
 David Cooke
 Fran Cotton
 Huw Davies
 Paul Dodge
 Dusty Hare
 Bob Hesford
 John Horton
 Nick Jeavons
 Mike Rafter
 Marcus Rose
 Gordon Sargent
 John Scott
 Austin Sheppard
 Mike Slemen
 Colin Smart
 Steve Smith
 Peter Wheeler
 Clive Woodward

France

Head coach: Jacques Fouroux

 Pierre Berbizier
 Roland Bertranne
 Serge Blanco
 Alain Caussade
 Manuel Carpentier
 Didier Codorniou
 Philippe Dintrans
 Pierre Dospital
 Serge Gabernet
 Jean-François Imbernon
 Jean-Luc Joinel
 Pierre Lacans
 Yves Lafarge
 Guy Laporte
 Patrick Mesny
 Robert Paparemborde
 Laurent Pardo
 Daniel Revailler
 Jean-Pierre Rives (c.)
 Bernard Vivies

Ireland

Head coach: Tom Kiernan

 Ollie Campbell
 John Cantrell
 Willie Duggan
 Mick Fitzpatrick
 Brendan Foley
 Michael Gibson
 Kenneth Hooks
 David Irwin
 Moss Keane
 Hugo MacNeill
 Freddie McLennan
 Paul McNaughton
 John O'Driscoll
 Phil Orr
 Francis Quinn
 John Robbie
 Fergus Slattery (c.)
 Donal Spring
 Tony Ward
 Pa Whelan

Scotland

Head coach: Jim Telfer

 Jim Aitken
 John Beattie
 Jim Calder
 Bill Cuthbertson
 Colin Deans
 Gordon Dickson
 David Gray
 Bruce Hay
 Andy Irvine (c.)
 Roy Laidlaw
 David Leslie
 Steve Munro
 Jim Renwick
 Keith Robertson
 Norrie Rowan
 John Rutherford
 Alan Tomes

Wales

Head coach: John Lloyd

 Rob Ackerman
 Clive Burgess
 Gareth Davies
 Clive Davis
 Alun Donovan
 Gwyn Evans
 Steve Fenwick (c.)*
 Ray Gravell
 Rhodri Lewis
 Allan Martin
 Peter Morgan
 Dai Nicholas
 Gary Pearce
 Alan Phillips
 Graham Price
 Clive Rees
 David Richards
 Jeff Squire (c.)**
 Ian Stephens
 Geoff Wheel
 Brynmor Williams
 Gareth Williams
 Gerald Williams
 J.P.R. Williams

 captain in the first two games
 captain in the last two games

External links
1981 Six Nations Championship at ESPN

Six Nations Championship squads